Singles (2006–2011) is the first compilation by the British rock band The Feeling, released on 5 December 2011 through Universal Records.

The album collects all 11 singles from the band's three previous studio albums, Twelve Stops and Home, Join with Us and Together We Were Made, two album tracks and a new version of "Rosé". This new version of "Rosé", recorded for the Burberry Body campaign, was released as the lead single from the album on 26 September 2011. The Rosé EP was released on 28 November 2011.

Lead singer Dan Gillespie Sells stated: "The Burberry advert is going to take our music to parts of the world where it's never been before, so we wanted to put together a retrospective of some of our best moments for anyone who has just discovered us. Plus, we've been releasing records for half a decade now, which feels like something worth celebrating. It's definitely a collection of songs that we're very proud of."

Track listing

References

2011 compilation albums
The Feeling albums
Universal Music Group compilation albums
Island Records compilation albums